Joseph Anton Maria Christen (22 February 1767 – 30 March 1838) was a Swiss sculptor.

Life 
Christen was born in Buochs, canton of Nidwalden, Switzerland. In 1785 he became a pupil of the portrait painter Johann Melchior Wyrsch in Lucerne, but soon turned to sculpture. From 1788 to 1791 he worked in Rome under the supervision of Alexander Trippel and then settled in Basel.

His works include a statue of Nicholas of Flüe, the group Angelica and Medor (1791), busts of Salomon Gessner, Johann Jakob Bodmer, Hans von Hallwyl, Johann Heinrich Pestalozzi, Gottlieb Konrad Pfeffel, the Countess of Montgelas (pictured) and a herm of the Emperor Napoleon.

In later life he was an inmate of Thorberg Castle, at that time a lunatic asylum, where he died.

His son was Raphael Christen, also a sculptor.

Sources 

 , 1998
von Matt, Hans, 1957: Der Bildhauer Joseph Maria Christen, 1767 – 1838. Lucerne: Diepold Schilling Verlag

External links 

Swiss sculptors
People from Nidwalden
1767 births
1838 deaths